Herwig is both a masculine German given name and a surname. Notable people with the name include:

Given name:
Herwig Ahrendsen (born 1948), German handball player
Herwig Dirnböck (born 1935), Austrian sprint canoeist
Herwig Drechsel (born 1973), Austrian footballer
Herwig Görgemanns (born 1931), German classical scholar
Herwig Kircher (born 1955), Austrian footballer
Herwig Kogelnik (born 1932), Austrian electrical engineer
Herwig Mitteregger (born 1953), Austrian musician
Herwig Reiter (born 1941), Austrian composer
Herwig Schopper (born 1924), German physicist
Herwig van Staa (born 1942), Austrian politician
Herwig Wolfram (born 1934), Austrian historian

Surname:
Bob Herwig (1914–1974), American football player
Conrad Herwig (born 1959), American jazz trombonist
Holger Herwig (born 1941), German-Canadian historian
Malte Herwig (born 1972), German writer, journalist and literary critic
Walther Herwig (1838–1912), German jurist, biologist and politician

German-language surnames
German masculine given names